The Eastern Branch Elizabeth River is a  tidal river in the Hampton Roads area of the U.S. state of Virginia.  The river flows from east to west, starting in Virginia Beach.  At its crossing by Interstate 64 it becomes the boundary between Virginia Beach and the city of Norfolk, and farther west it is the boundary between Norfolk and the city of Chesapeake. For its final  it is entirely within the city of Norfolk.

See also
List of rivers of Virginia

References

USGS Hydrologic Unit Map - State of Virginia (1974)

Rivers of Virginia
Bodies of water of Virginia Beach, Virginia
Rivers of Norfolk, Virginia